The MTV Video Music Award for Best Video Game Score was only given out in 2006 as a complement to the Best Video Game Soundtrack award.  With the 2007 revamp of the VMAs, this award was eliminated and never brought back.

Winners

References

Awards established in 2006
Awards disestablished in 2006
MTV Video Music Awards